Buffington is an unincorporated community and census-designated place in Menallen Township, Fayette County, Pennsylvania, United States. The community was part of the New Salem-Buffington CDP, before it was split into two separate CDPs for the 2010 census. The population was 292 as of the 2010 census.

Demographics

References

Census-designated places in Fayette County, Pennsylvania
Census-designated places in Pennsylvania